e
This is a list of media set in San Diego, California.

Novels
 It's Not PMS, It's You by Rich Amooi (2019)
 The Angel Gang by Ken Kuhlken (1993)
 The Fallen by T. Jefferson Parker (2006)
 Kiln People by David Brin (2002)
 The Loud Adios by Ken Kuhlken (1989)
 Rainbows End by Vernor Vinge (2006)
 Tecate Peak, The Edge by Michael Hudon (2012)
 Tijuana Straits by Kem Nunn (2004)
 The Vagabond Virgins by Ken Kuhlken (2008)
 The Venus Deal by Ken Kuhlken (1991)
 The Winter of Frankie Machine (novel) by Don Winslow (2006)
 Superhero High by T. H. Hernandez (2018)

Books
 Dr Seuss Books from 1948 to 1991

Films

TV shows
 Bucket & Skinner's Epic Adventures on Nickelodeon (2011–2012)
 Cavemen on ABC (2007)
Criminal Minds (Season 1, Episode 4; Season 6, Episode 21; Season 10, Episode 5; Season 12 Episode 10) on CBS (2005-2020)
 Drake & Josh on Nickelodeon (2004–2007)
 The Ex List on CBS (2008)
The Fosters on ABC Family
 The Game (2006)
 Gomer Pyle, U.S.M.C. on CBS (1964-1969)
Grace and Frankie on Netflix (2015–present)
 Harry O on ABC (1974-1976)
 Hennesey on CBS (1959-1962)
 High Tide (1994-1997)
 Hunter (1984 American TV series) on NBC (2003)
 John from Cincinnati (2007)
 Manhunt (TV series, police) (1959-1961)
 NTSF:SD:SUV:: on Adult Swim (2011–present)
 Physical (TV series) on Apple TV+
 Renegade on USA Network (1992-1997)
Silk Stalkings on USA Network (1991-1999)
 Simon & Simon on CBS (1981-1988)
 Terriers on FX (2010)
 That '80s Show on Fox (2002)
 Veronica Mars on The CW Television Network (2004-2007)
   Pitch on Fox (2016-2017)
 Abby's on NBC (2019)
 The Weekenders (2000-2004)

Reality shows

 Beach Patrol on Court TV (2006)
 COPS, Season 2, episodes 14 to 18 (1989, 1990); Season 21, episodes 6 to 8, 10, 18, 36 (2008, 2009)
 The Real World: San Diego on MTV (2004)
 House Hunters on HGTV (1999-present)
 Room Raiders (Season 4, Episode 19) on MTV

Anime 

 Grisaia no Rakuen, Season 2, episodes 2-3 (2015)

Video games
 Midnight Club 3:DUB Edition and Midnight Club 3:DUB Edition Remix, a racing free roam city
 Tony Hawk's Underground, Balboa Park is featured as a skate level

Comic books/Manga
 Aquaman vol 6 #s 15-49 (March 2003 to April 2006) and irregularly since (as Sub Diego)
 Fathom vol 1, 2, 4 and 5, certain areas of the comic book series take place in San Diego
JoJo's Bizarre Adventure Part 7: Steel Ball Run vol 1 (2004), takes place in 1890's San Diego.

See also

 Films shot in San Diego

References

External links
 Movies Filmed in San Diego

 
Lists of films by setting
San Diego
media